PLOS Genetics is a peer-reviewed open access scientific journal established in 2005 and published by the Public Library of Science. The founding editor-in-chief was Wayne N. Frankel (Columbia University Medical Center). The current editors-in-chief are Gregory S. Barsh (HudsonAlpha Institute of Biotechnology and Stanford University School of Medicine) and Gregory P. Copenhaver (The University of North Carolina at Chapel Hill). The journal covers research on all aspects of genetics and genomics.

Abstracting and indexing
The journal is abstracted and indexed in:

According to the Journal Citation Reports, the journal has a 2020 impact factor of 5.917.

Research Prize
Since its tenth year of publication, the journal annually awards the $5000 PLOS Genetics Research Prize for the best paper published in the previous year based on nominations from members of the genetics community.

References

External links

Creative Commons Attribution-licensed journals
Genetics journals
Open access journals
PLOS academic journals
Monthly journals